Pniewo may refer to:

Pniewo, Koło County in Greater Poland Voivodeship (west-central Poland)
Pniewo, Złotów County in Greater Poland Voivodeship (west-central Poland)
Pniewo, Łódź Voivodeship (central Poland)
Pniewo, Gmina Międzyrzecz in Lubusz Voivodeship (west Poland)
Pniewo, Gmina Bledzew in Lubusz Voivodeship (west Poland)
Pniewo, Nowy Dwór Mazowiecki County in Masovian Voivodeship (east-central Poland)
Pniewo, Pułtusk County in Masovian Voivodeship (east-central Poland)
Pniewo, Podlaskie Voivodeship (north-east Poland)
Pniewo, Warmian-Masurian Voivodeship (north Poland)
Pniewo, Gryfice County in West Pomeranian Voivodeship (north-west Poland)
Pniewo, Gryfino County in West Pomeranian Voivodeship (north-west Poland)